Ernesto Maria Piovella O.SS.C.A. (29 October 1867, Milan - 18 February 1949, Cagliari) was an Italian Roman Catholic priest and bishop.

Life
He entered the oblate missionaries of Rho and served as vicar general at Ravenna. Pope Pius X made him bishop of Alghero and he was ordained by cardinal Andrea Carlo Ferrari, archbishop of Milan, Pasquale Morganti O.SS.C.A., archbishop of Ravenna and Giovanni Mauri, auxiliary bishop of Milan. He was later made archbishop of Oristano and archbishop of Cagliari. He called a diocesan synod in 1928. He is buried in the Sacra Spina chapel in Cagliari Cathedral and his beatification process has begun.

Sources
http://www.catholic-hierarchy.org/bishop/bpiov.html

Italian Roman Catholic archbishops
Clergy from Milan
1949 deaths
1867 births